The Theme of Cyprus (thema Kyprou) was a Byzantine military-civilian province, located in the island of Cyprus, established in the 960s after the reconquest of Cyprus by the Byzantine navy. Prior to this the island had been a Byzantine-Arab condominium for three centuries, except occasional short periods where it was occupied by either power. A rebellion by governor Theophilos Erotikos in 1042, and another in 1092 by Rhapsomates, failed as they were quickly subdued by imperial forces. At the end of the 12th century there were again separatist tendencies in Cyprus: Isaac Komnenos of Cyprus proclaimed himself as "basileus" (emperor) in 1185. Cyprus remained under his command until its conquest in 1191 during the Third Crusade by Richard I of England, who sold it to the Knights Templars.

Sources
 

Cyprus
States and territories established in the 10th century
Byzantine Cyprus